William Tobias Ringeltaube, or Wilhelm Tobias Ringeltaube (1770- ?) was the first Protestant missionary in the far south of India. He spent much of his time in Travancore. He was the first child of Gottlieb Ringeltaube, Vicar of Scheidelwitz (today Szydlowice), near Brzeg, in Silesia. He was born on 8 August 1770. The cause and date of his death are uncertain, but it is widely believed that he died of liver failure whilst on a voyage to Africa. Others believe that he was killed by the natives whilst on a mission to Jakarta (then called Batavia).

Early life
Five days after his birth he was baptized and given the name William Tobias Ringeltaube. For seven years Ringeltaube grew up in the quietness of a country home; after this his father went to Warsaw in Poland, and spent nine years in the city. During this time, William was educated by his father before attending the University of Halle.

File:Uni-Halle-1836.jpg|Marthin Luther University of Halle

When he was 16, his father became a Court Preacher and General Superintendent at Oels, in Silesia. There, the young boy attended the Gymnaesium, but the boy was naturally shy and shunned all interaction with fellow students. In his 18th year he went on a walking tour, on which he made many friends. During this time, he made the decision to become a Christian missionary. Ordained in Wernigerode in 1796, he spent some time in Calcutta and England before he was invited by the London Missionary Society (LMS) in Year 1803 to join their Mission to India.

Benefit to the people of Mylaudy

There was a well on the south side of the Church and dig a pond a short distance away from the church and solved the water problem, for the benefit of the people of mylaudy. He also cleared/made some fields near the pond. He gave some clothes to the poor and free medicine to the sick, He gave freedom for many slaves with his own money. Every christmas, he gave feast for all church members in Mylaudy
He helped stop many of the taxes that were heavily imposed on people.

Appearance of Ringeltaube

The appearance of the ringlethoube is very attractive. The facial expression is charming. He is 5 feet 9 inches tall. With blonde hair. The eyes are blue in colour and have a keen eye.

Ministry
Maharasan Vedamonikam, the first Protestant Christian from Mylaudy, was baptized by Rev. Kohlhoff and he invited Ringeltaube. Once Ringeltaube reached Tharangam padi, Maharasan Vedamanickam took him to Travancore. His ministries are building schools, orphanages, job training and proclaiming the gospel.

He opened many churches in Kanyakumari district. Mylaudy, South Thamaraikulam, Puthalam, Koilvilai (James town), Zionpuram, Perinbapuram and Ananthanadarkudy churches are the fruits of his ministry.
One of these was Perinbapuram Church  from Nagercoil on the way to Monday market. All church has a history of more than 200 years. Thamaraikulam church is 5 km from Kanyakumari. Ananthanadarkudy church is 7 km from Nagercoil. Mylaudy church is 10 km from Nagercoil and Kanyakumari.

The first Protestant missionary to South Travancore was William Tobias Ringeltaube of the LMS in 1806. Ringeltaube, born in 1770, Pass on an invitation of Maharasan Vedamonikam of Mylaudy who had been converted christian in Tanjore by Rev. Kohlhoff, an SPCK (Society for Promoting Christian Knowledge) missionary. Ringeltaube was moved at the plight of the social out-castes of South Travancore. He worked among them and in May 1809 laid the foundation for church in Mylaudy. Within four months the Church Construction Work was Completed. In September, 1809 Ringeltaube dedicated the first Protestant Church of South Travancore. He visited ‘Trivandrum’ in 1811. He left Travancore in 1816.

Miracles from Ringeltaube

From 1806 to 1809 the pastors used to visit Palayamkottai frequently from Mylaudy. While Coming so, he knelt down, prayed, and drank the water that had accumulated on the rock at Kozhikottupottai. that day onwards it become spring
When the pastor was preaching to the people at Ammandi vilai on February 25, 1810. He took a child who came near him and put him down Immediately the child walked away. Those present were amazed as the leg-crippled child walked away from the pastor. Later only did the pastor learn that the child had a leg deformity.
The deadliest famine occurred in 1813. The famine lasted for several months. He went to their house in Mylaudy and prayed fervently and then came out and looked at the sky. It immediately rained. Everyone was amazed at the strength of the pastor's prayers

The sufferings of Ringeltaube

Ringeltaube suffered many hardships to dispel the darkness of our ignorance. For three years he struggled to get permission to build a church in mylaudy.
He suffered a lot from physical abuse.  He was found to have lost strength in the body due to frequent illnesses. Living in a simple house without the best nutritious food, without good facilities , without good clothes. He walked around with a simple straw hat on his head and spread the gospel.

Letters from Ringeltaube

Among the many letters Ringeltaube wrote, we have 9 letters to his sister, three letters to his brother, and four letters to the London Mission Society.
Through these letters we learn about his travels, ministry, the condition of Christians, and the disease in his liver.

Everything written to her sister in these letters is seen as tragic. 
Despite the tragedy in his letter, he did not regret it, except that he was glad to be an evangelist. 
In the letters he refers to himself as a parasite, a helpless, old man.
Through letters he learns that he had invited his brother Ernest to Tharangambadi to work with him and that he had not agreed to come.

Ringletaube at mylaudy

On Friday, April 25, 1806, at 6 pm, the pastor arrived in mylaudy. On Sunday the 27th, He (Ringletaube) conducted worship at Vethamonikam Desikar's house. Diwan Veluthambi objected to Ringeltaube's plan to build a church in mylaudy. But Colonel McCauley helped. In March 1807, 40 people were baptized in Mylaudy. Due to the revolt of Veluthambi many problems began to arise for the Mylaudy Christians. During the riots, Vedamanikkam Desikar was hiding in Marunduvazh hill and Parvatha hill. Ringletaube served at Palayankottai. After the uprising he wandered to get permission to build the temple.

End trip

On the 23rd of January 1816, all the congregation came to Mylaudy and expressed their desire to return to their homeland. He handed over the responsibility to Vedamonikam Desikar and sailed from Kollam to Chennai on the 5th of February. When the ship arrived at Manakudi, he remembered the debt he had written on the wall of his house. He commented the sailor to stop the ship and  travelled to Mylaudy and destroyed the debt account. Again, he said goodbye to the people of Mylaudy and sailed to Chennai. 

The pastor reached Sri Lanka from Chennai and wrote a letter to his sister. He then reached Malacca from Sri Lanka. He wrote a letter to her sister and London Mission Society Treasurer Mr. Joseph kokson

he left malacca, and travelled to batavia on September 27,1816. He died on the way to the ship and was buried at sea. Proof of this was written on the ship's daily diary as A PASSENGER DIED. Although many people have said many times about his death, it is believed that this is true.
However, the death of Ringeltaube was seen as the death of the devotee Enoch.

References

Bibliography

1770 births
Year of death unknown
Protestant missionaries in India
German Protestant missionaries
Christianity in Tamil Nadu
German expatriates in India